The European Accounting Review is the peer-refereed journal of the European Accounting Association, published by Taylor & Francis.

The European Accounting Review is an international scholarly journal of the European Accounting Association (EAA). Devoted to the advancement of accounting knowledge, European Accounting Review provides a forum for the publication of high-quality accounting research manuscripts. It emphasizes openness and flexibility, not only regarding the substantive issues of accounting research, but also with respect to paradigms, methodologies, and styles of conducting that research. European Accounting Review is global in scope and welcomes submissions relating to any country or region as long as their relevance to an international audience is clearly communicated.

The European Accounting Review was established in 1992.  The journal initially published three issues per year, which was increased to four issues per year as of 1995.  It is the only academic journal to provide a European forum for accounting research.  The editor is Beatriz Garcia Osma, of Universidad Carlos III de Madrid, Spain.

The European Accounting Review organizes an Annual Conference since 2020.

Registered Reports and Open Science Section 

The European Accounting Review promotes research that is based on the open science principles, meaning the practice of science in such a way that others can collaborate and contribute. Research that complies to these principles can be submitted to the newly introduced Open Science Section. We expect research in this section to be based on data that is findable, accessible, interoperable and reusable (FAIR). Commercially licensed data can qualify as FAIR as long as the authors provide reproducible code to obtain the data. Applied methods should be communicated by means that make findings reproducible, normally by providing program code. Data and code will be assessed as potential separate contributions to the literature in addition to the actual findings of the study per se. The Open Science Section is open to all topics and methods, including work that is mostly methodological in nature.

In addition, the European Accounting Review introduces a new section Registered Reports. Submissions to this section have to follow a two-stage review process. The first stage requires a research proposal containing a motivated research question, clearly characterizing the potential contribution of the proposed study and a detailed outline of the proposed research design. This research proposal will be reviewed using the normal review process. In case that (a potentially revised version of) the research proposal is accepted, and the actual research is being carried out according to the accepted proposal, the final study will only be only reviewed for expositional clarity but not for contribution and implementation. We envision that this new section is particularly fitting for experimental studies and for studies that require substantial upfront investments in terms of data collection. Submissions that fit to both, the Registered Reports and the Open Science Section are possible and particularly encouraged.

Past Editors 

2016-2019: Hervé Stolowy 

2012-2015: Laurence van Lent 

2006-2011: Salvador Carmona 

2000-2005: Kari Lukka 

1997-2000: Anne Loft, Peter Walton

1992-1997: Ann Jorissen, Anne Loft & Peter Walton

Abstracting and indexing 
The journal is abstracted and indexed in:

According to the Journal Citation Reports, the journal has a 2018 impact factor of 2.322.

References

Accounting journals
English-language journals
Publications established in 1992
Taylor & Francis academic journals